The 1940 Bulgarian Cup Final was the 3rd final of the Bulgarian Cup (in this period the tournament was named Tsar's Cup), and was contested between FC 13 Sofia and Sportklub Plovdiv on 13 October 1940 at Levski Playground in Sofia. FC 13 won the final 2–1.

Match

Details

See also
1939–40 Bulgarian National Football Division

References

Bulgarian Cup finals
Cup Final